Love Laughs at Andy Hardy is a 1946 American film released by Metro-Goldwyn-Mayer, directed by Willis Goldbeck and starring Mickey Rooney and Lewis Stone.

The film is also known under its American promotional title Uncle Andy Hardy.

This was the 15th, next-to-last Andy Hardy film produced. The final installment, Andy Hardy Comes Home, would be made 12 years later (1958) in a failed attempt to revive the franchise.

This film was also noteworthy for being the last to feature veteran character actor Lewis Stone as Judge Hardy. Stone continued his career for the next seven years, making 10 more films until his death in 1953 at age 73.

Plot 
The story starts in the small town of Carvel, where the honorable judge Hardy (Lewis Stone) and his wife Emily (Fay Holden) eagerly await their son's return from the military. Andy (Mickey Rooney) has received an honorable discharge from the Army after a service of two years. His parents are unaware of the fact that Andy is looking to get back with his college sweetheart Kay (Bonita Granville). One day soon after Andy's homecoming, his mother Emily observes him looking at store window displays of wedding rings and baby clothing, and suspects that her son must be in love. Emily's suspicions are soon confirmed when Andy, who usually has had an eye for girls, barely notices the very attractive singer, Isobel Gonzales (Lina Romay), when they are introduced.

Isobel is a regular singer at the Carvel country club, and when Andy comes there and they are introduced to each other, she falls in love with him. Andy, however, isn't smitten by Isobel in the same way, still preoccupied with thinking about his college sweetheart. Andy wants to return to Wainwright college to finish his studies and meet his sweetheart as soon as possible. Andy is very determined though, to keep the romance a secret form his parents. When Andy is with his parents visiting the country club, he finds out there is a telegram, sent by Kay, that is supposed to be delivered to him at his parents' house. He panics, and in a desperate attempt to hide it from his parents, he makes up an excuse to leave the club to help out a friend. He convinces a friend to cover for him and spread a fake story about a broken water faucet. But in reality he rushes home to the house and intercepts the telegram before anyone else gets to see it.

A series of unfortunate events take place from this moment on. Andy is about to take a shower at the house when he realizes that the water is switched off. He goes outside in his robe to switch it on, when the front door shuts behind him and locks automatically. Andy is stranded outside in the garden, and has to wait in the shrubbery until his parents arrive home from the country club. Before he has a chance to get inside the house again, a passing police man discovers him hiding in the bushes. The police man doesn't believe Andy's story when he tries to explain his business in the garden, and insists on taking him inside to get a confirmation from his parents.

Emily is upset with her son's recent erratic behavior and blames the fact that he is blinded by love. She forces her husband to talk with his son and straighten him out on the subject of choosing the right kind of woman. Andy confesses his plan to ask Kay to marry him when he comes back to college. His parents don't approve of this plan and decide to follow him to Wainwright – to keep an eye on him and keep him away from his sweetheart.

The president of the school council, Duke Johnson (Hal Hackett), offers Andy the honor of being chairman of the freshman dance as soon as he gets back to the college. Andy accepts the offer, but finds out soon after that Kay cannot attend the dance. Because of a family emergency she is required to go home to her legal guardian, Dane Kittridge (Dick Simmons). Duke understands that Andy is in need of a date at the dance, so he sets up with a girl named Coffy Smith (Dorothy Ford), who is a great deal taller than Andy, making him look ridiculous beside her.

Andy is quite embarrassed by their appearance together, but soon warms up to the bigger girl and they become good friends. Andy is shocked however, when Kay comes back to Wainwright and tells him that she has fallen in love with her guardian Dane, and that she is planning on marrying him the very next day. Andy is heartbroken, but as a sign of good faith he nevertheless agrees to be Kay's best man at the wedding. When the wedding is over Andy makes plans to go to South America and forget his sorrows, but his father talks to him and convinces him to go back to Wainwright and complete his degree.

Cast 
 Mickey Rooney as Andy Hardy
 Lewis Stone as Judge Hardy
 Sara Haden as Aunt Milly
 Bonita Granville as Kay Wilson
 Lina Romay as Isobel Gonzales
 Fay Holden as Mrs. Emily Hardy
 Dorothy Ford as Coffy Smith
 Hal Hackett as Duke Johnson
 Dick Simmons as Dane Kittridge
 Clinton Sundberg as Haberdashery clerk
 Geraldine Wall as Miss Geeves
 Addison Richards as Mr. Benedict

Production
While Mickey Rooney was in the army, MGM announced Booth Tarkington had developed a story for a Hardy movie without Andy, The Hardy Family's Country Cousin. Andy would not appear but would be referenced in conversations. The film was not made.

This was Mickey Rooney's first film after he got out of the army. It was originally entitled Uncle Andy Hardy.

Soundtrack

Reception
According to MGM records the film earned $1,656,000 in the US and Canada and $733,000 elsewhere, resulting in a profit to the studio of $529,000.

Copyright status 
This movie is in the public domain in the United States as of 1974 because Metro-Goldwyn-Mayer neglected to renew the copyright.

Comic book adaptation
 Fiction House Movie Comics #3 (June 1947)

References

External links 
 
 
 
 
 
  Love Laughs at Andy Hardy complete film on YouTube

1946 films
1946 romantic comedy films
American romantic comedy films
American black-and-white films
1940s English-language films
Films directed by Willis Goldbeck
Metro-Goldwyn-Mayer films
Films with screenplays by William Ludwig
Films adapted into comics
1940s American films